The Old Grace Episcopal Church Rectory is a historic clergy house in Astoria, Oregon, United States.

The rectory was entered onto the National Register of Historic Places in 1990.

See also
National Register of Historic Places listings in Clatsop County, Oregon
Grace Episcopal Church (Astoria, Oregon)

References

External links

Properties of religious function on the National Register of Historic Places in Oregon
Clergy houses in the United States
Italianate architecture in Oregon
Houses completed in 1887
Houses on the National Register of Historic Places in Astoria, Oregon
1887 establishments in Oregon
Individually listed contributing properties to historic districts on the National Register in Oregon
Italianate church buildings in the United States